Beaulieu-sur-Oudon (literally Beaulieu on Oudon) is a commune in the Mayenne department in northwestern France.

Geography
The river Oudon flows through the commune and forms part of its southeastern border.

Population

See also
Communes of Mayenne

References

Communes of Mayenne